Zanna Bianca e il cacciatore solitario (internationally released as White Fang and the Hunter) is a 1975 Italian adventure film directed by Alfonso Brescia. Despite the title tries to market the commercial success of Lucio Fulci's White Fang, the film's plot has no connection with the novel. The film was poorly received by critics, being defined as "pathetic"  and marked as "trash", and gained some cult status in reason of its reputation.

Cast 
 Robert Woods: Sandy Shaw 
 Ignazio Spalla: Dollar 
 Malisa Longo: Connie 
 Robert Hundar: Ferguson 
 Franco Lantieri: Trent 
 Linda Sini: Luna

References

External links

1975 films
Films about dogs
Films about wolves
Spaghetti Western films
1975 Western (genre) films
Films scored by Alessandro Alessandroni
1970s Italian films
1970s Italian-language films